The 1968 Wyoming Cowboys football team represented the University of Wyoming in the 1968 NCAA University Division football season.  Led by seventh-year head coach Lloyd Eaton, they were members of the Western Athletic Conference (WAC) and played their home games on campus at War Memorial Stadium in Laramie.

The Cowboys had a record of 7–3, won a third consecutive WAC title, and outscored their opponents 242 to 118.

Schedule

Roster

1969 NFL/AFL Draft
Three Cowboys were selected in the 1969 NFL/AFL Draft, the third common draft, which lasted seventeen rounds (442 selections).

References

Wyoming
Wyoming Cowboys football seasons
Western Athletic Conference football champion seasons
Wyoming Cowboys football